Xu Can (born March 9, 1994) is a Chinese professional boxer who held the WBA (Regular) featherweight title from 2019 to 2021. As of December 2021, Xu is rated as the world's ninth-best active featherweight by The Ring magazine, and tenth by ESPN and BoxRec.

Professional career

Early career 
Xu turned professional in 2013. His first 14 fights ended in decision, of which he was victorious in 12 of them. In his 15th fight on October 3, 2017, he recorded his first stoppage win against former WBA (Regular) super bantamweight champion Nehomar Cermeño, prevailing via seventh-round corner retirement. The win saw Xu capture the vacant WBA International featherweight title.

WBA (Regular) featherweight champion

Xu vs. Rojas 
Xu was rewarded for his twelve fight winning streak with the opportunity to challenge the reigning WBA (Regular) featherweight champion Jesús Rojas. The bout was scheduled for the undercard of the Jaime Munguia and Takeshi Inoue WBO super-welterweight title fight, which took place at the Toyota Center in Houston, Texas on January 26, 2019, and was broadcast by DAZN and Canal Space. Xu won the fight, which BoxingScene dubbed an early candidate for "Fight of the Year", by unanimous decision. He was awarded scorecards of 116–112, 117–111 and 118–110. Both fighters threw a combined 2574 strikes total, with Xu landing 380 and Rojas 388 total punches. Xu became only the third Chinese world boxing champion, after Xiong Chaozhong and Zou Shiming.

Xu vs. Kubo 
Xu made his first title defense against the former WBA Regular featherweight champion Shun Kubo on May 26, 2019, at the Fuzhou Sports Center Gymnasium in his native Fuzhou, Jiangxi. He successfully retained his title with a sixth-round technical knockout of Kubo. Xu first knocked Kubo down near the end of the third round, before stopping the Japanese challenger with a flurry of punches at the 1:16 minute mark of the sixth round.

Xu vs. Robles III 
In his next title defense, Xu defeated Manny Robles III by unanimous decision, with scores of 120-108, 119-109, 118-110, on November 23.

Failed Warrington negotiations 
Talks were held in 2020 and early 2021 to try to make Xu's third defense of his title against the IBF champion at the time, Josh Warrington. However, the fight was postponed due to disagreements from both sides: Xu wanted fans present at the fight, and Warrington refused to leave the United Kingdom to fight on Chinese soil. The chances of Xu and Warrington ever fighting were dramatically reduced when Warrington subsequently vacated his IBF title and then lost to the unheralded Mauricio Lara in February 2021, when he was sensationally knocked out by Lara in an upset defeat.

Xu vs. Wood 
On July 6, 2021, it was announced that Xu would be defending his WBA (Regular) title against British featherweight champion Leigh Wood in Brentwood, England on July 31 as part of Matchroom's Fight Camp. Despite being a -350 favorite, Xu was outboxed during periods of the fight, and suffered an upset defeat via twelfth-round technical knockout.

Personal life 
Xu was born in Fuzhou, Jiangxi, and has since moved his residence to Beijing. His parents were pastry-makers, and he was encouraged by his father to pursue a career in boxing. When Xu dropped out of junior high school during his third year, he joined China's only professional boxing club at the time, named Zhongwei, in Kunming, Yunnan where he began training as a boxer.

Professional boxing record

See also
List of featherweight boxing champions
List of WBA world champions

References

External links

Xu Can - Profile, News Archive & Current Rankings at Box.Live

1994 births
Living people
Chinese male boxers
Sportspeople from Suzhou
Featherweight boxers
Super-featherweight boxers
Light-welterweight boxers
World featherweight boxing champions
World Boxing Association champions